Ad Apostolorum principis (29 June 1958) is an encyclical of Pope Pius XII on Communism and the Church in China. It describes systematic  persecutions of bishops, priests, religious and faithful and the attempts of the government to establish a patriotic Catholic Church, independent of Rome.

Background

The Catholic Church in China prospered in the early 20th century, despite many obstacles. A hierarchy was established in China, opening many opportunities. But after the Communist victory in the Chinese Civil War, the Christian communities were destroyed and the missionaries expelled. Many bishops, priests, and religious men and women, together with many of the faithful, were  imprisoned, sent to re-education camps, underwent torture and show trials. Pope Pius XII issued in 1952 the  encyclical Cupimus Imprimis, in which he accused the persecutors and defended the Church,  "a stranger to no people on earth, much less hostile to any" against the accusation of being against the people of China.  In 1954, he published another Encyclical Letter, Ad Sinarum gentem, in which he refuted accusations made against Catholics in China, stating that they are loyal and faithful to their country.

Present problems
Since that time, the Church in China underwent even more difficulties. A "patriotic" Catholic movement is forced by every means on all the faithful A movement for  patriotism and peace, who can be against that, asks Pius, is in reality  just a fraud.  This association aims primarily at making Catholics gradually embrace the tenets of atheistic materialism.
All are forced to approve and participate and those bishops, priests, religious men, nuns, and the faithful in considerable numbers,  who do not participate, are already in  prison; Priests, religious men and women, ecclesiastical students, and faithful of all ages are forced to attend courses and an almost endless series of lectures and discussions, lasting for weeks and months, in order to weaken the strength of mind and will,  by a kind of psychic coercion.
Under such circumstances, every Christian should cast aside all doubt and calmly and firmly repeat the words with which Peter and the other Apostles answered the first persecutors of the Church: "We must obey God rather than men."

Illegal consecrations
Pius speaks out  against those, who elect and appoint bishops of their own political willing, without any consultation with the Holy See. Many such elections have been held contrary to all Church  laws. Some priests have rashly dared to receive Episcopal consecration, despite the public and severe warning of the  Apostolic See.   He declares, that  "bishops who have been neither named nor confirmed by the Apostolic See but who, on the contrary, have been elected and consecrated in defiance of its express orders, enjoy no powers of teaching or of jurisdiction since jurisdiction passes to bishops only through the Roman Pontiff"  Acts requiring the power of Holy Orders which are performed by ecclesiastics of this kind, though they are valid as long as the consecration conferred on them was valid, are yet gravely illicit, that is, criminal and sacrilegious.

Consequently, for illegal consecrations,  an excommunication reserved specialissimo modo to the Apostolic See has been established which is automatically incurred by the consecrator and by anyone who has received consecration irresponsibly conferred.

Prayers and hope
In cordial, emotional words, the Pope assures his bishops, priests and faithful of his daily commemoration  during his morning mass and comforts them:

References
 Acta Apostolicae Sedis, Roma, Vaticano, 1939, 1951
 Ad Apostolorum principis, Acta Apostolicae Sedis, AAS, 1958, 601

Footnotes

External links
 Ad Apostolorum principis: full text of English translation on the Vatican website

Catholic Church in China
Encyclicals of Pope Pius XII
Persecution of Catholics during the pontificate of Pope Pius XII
Religious persecution by communists
June 1958 events
1958 in Christianity